Węgrów is a town in eastern Poland; the capital of Węgrów Country.

Węgrów may also refer to:

Węgrów County, a unit of territorial administration and local government (powiat) in Masovian Voivodeship
Węgrów, Lower Silesian Voivodeship, a village in the administrative district of Gmina Długołęka, Wrocław County
Battle of Węgrów, important skirmish of January Uprising in the Russian Partition of Poland

See also
Węgry (disambiguation)
Wegrow (disambiguation)